Apostacon (portmanteau of "apostate" + "conference"), before 2013 known as Midwest Humanist Conference, Midwest Humanist and Freethought Conference and Midwest Freethought Conference, is an annual event about atheism, freethought, humanism, secularism and skepticism in the (Midwestern) United States. The conference, which embraces the parody religion of the Flying Spaghetti Monster, is aimed at "atheists, humanists, agnostics, skeptics, apostates, freethinkers, rationalists and pastafarians."

History 
The 2009 event was held at the University of Nebraska–Lincoln (UNL), hosted by the Lincoln Secular Humanists and coordinated by Humanist and LGBT activist Jason Frye. Speakers lectured on topics ranging from Reproductive Rights, LGBT Rights, and community building. In 2010, the second conference themed “No God, No Problem” was again coordinated by Frye, but this time held in the Country Inn & Suites in Lincoln, Nebraska; there were 80 attendees. From 2011 until 2014, the conference was held in Omaha, Nebraska. During Apostacon 2014, famous science communicator and astrophysicist Neil deGrasse Tyson delivered the keynote address. The 2015 installment was held in Dallas, Texas, the first time outside of Nebraska.

In October 2015 Apostacon president Sarah Morehead was removed by the executive board for allegedly defrauding the conference.

See also 
List of skeptical conferences

References

External links 

Events in Nebraska
Events in Texas
Humanist associations
Recurring events established in 2009
Skeptic conferences
Atheism rallies
2009 establishments in Nebraska